Hypericum abilianum is a shrub in the genus Hypericum, in the section Adenosepalum, known only from one specimen collected in Africa.

Description
The species is a subshrub 40 centimeters tall with orange to red stems. It has 3–5 flowers that are each approximately 15 mm in diameter. Its golden yellow petals are 8–10 mm long and 4 mm broad, tinged with red on the upper surfaces.

Distribution
It has only been found in Angola, but no conclusive distribution data has been found. The single cataloged specimen was gathered in the Huíla Province in 1960 by E.J. Mendes.

References

abilianum
Endemic flora of Angola